Marcory is a suburb of Abidjan, Ivory Coast. It is one of the 10 urban communes of the city. Marcory is one of four communes of Abidjan that are entirely south of Ébrié Lagoon, the others being Treichville, Koumassi, and Port-Bouët.

References

Communes of Abidjan
Suburbs in Ivory Coast